Bythocytheridae is a family of ostracods belonging to the order Podocopida.

Genera

Genera:
 Abyssobythere Ayress & Whatley, 1989
 Acvocaria Gramm, 1975
 Antarcticythere Neale, 1967

References

Ostracods